= Time Warner Cable Spectrum =

Time Warner Cable Spectrum may refer to

- Time Warner Cable, an American cable communications company acquired by Charter Communications
- Spectrum (brand), a trade name of Charter Communications
